Steelfactory is the sixteenth studio album by U.D.O.,  released on 31 August 2018 by AFM Records. It is the first album to feature Udo Dirkschneider's son Sven as the new drummer. The first single "Rising High" was made available for streaming on 15 June 2018. A music video was made for "One Heart One Soul". A lyric video was made for "Make the Move". Steelfactory is the final album to feature bassist Fitty Wienhold when he announced his departure in September 2018.

Album Information
Udo Dirkschneider says that the musical direction of Steelfactory is influenced by the touring of when the band performed under the name Dirkschneider from 2015 to 2018, during which at the time they only played Accept songs, "it's definitely an influence and also a feeling if you start songwriting. But I don't have a problem with this. [Laughs]"

Recording and writing
U.D.O. started work on the album in March 2017 after performing in North America. The music was composed by all members of the band, as opposed to the albums Steelhammer and Decadent, which was mainly composed by Dirkschneider and bassist Fitty Weinhold. Dirkschneider says that there was not a set goal on what type of sound he wanted to have, "We just start working on a new album and see what's coming up. Sometimes it's a little bit more aggressive; sometimes it's a little bit more melodic; sometimes you put keyboards into that, whatever. This time, I think on the whole album, it's a good mix of songs. We have really fast songs, uptempo songs, mid-tempo songs, ballads, everything." He says that Steelfactory has an influence of Accept.

Track listing
All tracks written by Udo Dirkschndeider; all music composed by U.D.O. except where noted

Personnel 
 Udo Dirkschneider – vocals
 Andrey Smirnov – guitar
 Fitty Wienhold – bass guitar
 Sven Dirkschneider – drums

Production
 Jacob Hansen – producer, recording (guitars), mixing
 Diego Verhagen – cover art, design (booklet)
 Holger Thielbörger – recording (bass, drums)
 Stefan Kaufmann – recording (vocals)

Charts

References 

U.D.O. albums
2018 albums
AFM Records albums
Albums produced by Jacob Hansen